Rudolf Koch-Erpach (9 April 1886 – 28 November 1971) was a German general during World War II who commanded the LVI Panzer Corps and the 1st Army.

Biography
Koch-Erpach was born in Munich, and eventually rose to the rank of general. In 1939, he commanded the German 8th Infantry Division during the invasion of Poland. On 24 June 1940, after the Battle of France he was awarded a Knight's Cross of the Iron Cross. From 1 November 1940 to 1 March 1941, Koch-Erpach commanded the German LX Corps. After a short break, he briefly commanded the XXXV Corps from 1 April 1941 to 1 May 1941.

Koch-Erpach commanded Military District VIII from 1 May 1942 to 26 January 1945. The headquarters for this military district was Breslau and the district included Silesia, Sudetenland, parts of Moravia, and parts of southwestern Poland. Military District VIII ceased operations in February 1945. From 26 January 1945 to 10 April 1945, Koch-Erpach commanded the LVI Panzer Corps. Later in 1945, Koch-Erpach was acting commander of the German 1st Army for two days before the war ended, from 6 May to 8 May. He died in Bad Boll.

Awards and decorations

 Knight's Cross of the Iron Cross on 24 June 1940 as Generalleutnant and commander of 8 Infanterie-Division

References

Citations

Bibliography

 

1886 births
1971 deaths
Military personnel from Munich
People from the Kingdom of Bavaria
German Army personnel of World War I
German Army generals of World War II
Generals of Cavalry (Wehrmacht)
German prisoners of war in World War II held by Poland
German prisoners of war in World War II held by the United States
Recipients of the clasp to the Iron Cross, 1st class
Recipients of the Knight's Cross of the Iron Cross